In the theory of general relativity, a stress–energy–momentum pseudotensor, such as the Landau–Lifshitz pseudotensor, is an extension of the non-gravitational stress–energy tensor that incorporates the energy–momentum of gravity. It allows the energy–momentum of a system of gravitating matter to be defined. In particular it allows the total of matter plus the gravitating energy–momentum to form a conserved current within the framework of general relativity, so that the total energy–momentum crossing the hypersurface (3-dimensional boundary) of any compact space–time hypervolume (4-dimensional submanifold) vanishes.

Some people (such as Erwin Schrödinger) have objected to this derivation on the grounds that pseudotensors are inappropriate objects in general relativity, but the conservation law only requires the use of the 4-divergence of a pseudotensor which is, in this case, a tensor (which also vanishes). Also, most pseudotensors are sections of jet bundles, which are now recognized as perfectly valid objects in general relativity.

Landau–Lifshitz pseudotensor
The use of the Landau–Lifshitz pseudotensor, a stress–energy–momentum pseudotensor for combined matter (including photons and neutrinos) plus gravity, allows the energy–momentum conservation laws to be extended into general relativity.  Subtraction of the matter stress–energy–momentum tensor from the combined pseudotensor results in the gravitational stress–energy–momentum pseudotensor.

Requirements
Landau and Lifshitz were led by four requirements in their search for a gravitational energy momentum pseudotensor, :
 that it be constructed entirely from the metric tensor, so as to be purely geometrical or gravitational in origin.
 that it be index symmetric, i.e. , (to conserve angular momentum)
 that, when added to the stress–energy tensor of matter, its total 4-divergence vanishes (this is required of any conserved current) so that we have a conserved expression for the total stress–energy–momentum.
 that it vanish locally in an inertial frame of reference (which requires that it only contains first order and not second or higher order derivatives of the metric). This is because the equivalence principle requires that the gravitational force field, the Christoffel symbols, vanish locally in some frames. If gravitational energy is a function of its force field, as is usual for other forces, then the associated gravitational pseudotensor should also vanish locally.

Definition
Landau & Lifshitz showed that there is a unique construction that satisfies these requirements, namely

where:

 Gμν is the Einstein tensor (which is constructed from the metric)
 gμν is the inverse of the metric tensor, gμν
  is the determinant of the metric tensor.
  are partial derivatives, not covariant derivatives.
 G is Newton's gravitational constant.

Verification
Examining the 4 requirement conditions we can see that the first 3 are relatively easy to demonstrate:
 Since the Einstein tensor, is itself constructed from the metric, so therefore is 
 Since the Einstein tensor, is symmetric so is  since the additional terms are symmetric by inspection.
 The Landau–Lifshitz pseudotensor is constructed so that when added to the stress–energy tensor of matter, its total 4-divergence vanishes: . This follows from the cancellation of the Einstein tensor, with the stress–energy tensor,  by the Einstein field equations; the remaining term vanishes algebraically due to the commutativity of partial derivatives applied across antisymmetric indices.
 The Landau–Lifshitz pseudotensor appears to include second derivative terms in the metric, but in fact the explicit second derivative terms in the pseudotensor cancel with the implicit second derivative terms contained within the Einstein tensor, .  This is more evident when the pseudotensor is directly expressed in terms of the metric tensor or the Levi-Civita connection; only the first derivative terms in the metric survive and these vanish where the frame is locally inertial at any chosen point.  As a result, the entire pseudotensor vanishes locally (again, at any chosen point) , which demonstrates the delocalisation of gravitational energy–momentum.

Cosmological constant
When the Landau–Lifshitz pseudotensor was formulated it was commonly assumed that the cosmological constant, was zero.  Nowadays we don't make that assumption, and the expression needs the addition of a  term, giving:

This is necessary for consistency with the Einstein field equations.

Metric and affine connection versions
Landau & Lifshitz also provide two equivalent but longer expressions for the Landau–Lifshitz pseudotensor:

 Metric tensor version: 
 Affine connection version: 
This definition of energy–momentum is covariantly applicable not just under Lorentz transformations, but also under general coordinate transformations.

Einstein pseudotensor
This pseudotensor was originally developed by Albert Einstein.

Paul Dirac showed that the mixed Einstein pseudotensor 

satisfies a conservation law

Clearly this pseudotensor for gravitational stress–energy is constructed exclusively from the metric tensor and its first derivatives. Consequently, it vanishes at any event when the coordinate system is chosen to make the first derivatives of the metric vanish because each term in the pseudotensor is quadratic in the first derivatives of the metric.  However it is not symmetric, and is therefore not suitable as a basis for defining the angular momentum.

See also
Bel–Robinson tensor
Gravitational wave

Notes

References

 

Tensors
Tensors in general relativity